Robert R. Locke (born February 19, 1932, in Montebello, California) is an American educator, historian and economist and emeritus professor of history, business, and management at the University of Hawaii at Manoa. He received his PhD from University of California at Los Angeles in 1965 and was a Fulbright fellow in Germany and England.

Books
 The Collapse of the American Management Mystique 1996
 Confronting Managerialism 2011
 Discovering Vera 2007
 The Entrepreneurial Shift: Americanization in European High-Technology Management Education 2004
 French Legitimists and the Politics of Moral Order in the Early Third Republic 2016

References

1932 births
Living people
20th-century American historians
American male non-fiction writers
University of Hawaiʻi at Mānoa faculty
University of California, Los Angeles alumni
20th-century American economists
People from Montebello, California
Historians from California
20th-century American male writers